Verret was a community in the Canadian province of New Brunswick until 1998 when it amalgamated with Edmundston.

Notable people

See also
List of neighbourhoods in New Brunswick

References

Neighbourhoods in Edmundston
Populated places disestablished in 1998
Former villages in New Brunswick